Elkhead is an unincorporated community in eastern Christian County, Missouri, United States. It is located on Route 14, approximately sixteen miles east of Ozark. Elkhead formerly had a post office with a ZIP code 65643, but mail is now served by the post office in Sparta.

Elkhead is part of the Springfield, Missouri Metropolitan Statistical Area.

A post office called Elkhead was established in 1871, and remained in operation until 1981. The community takes its name from nearby Elkhorn Creek.

References

Unincorporated communities in Christian County, Missouri
Springfield metropolitan area, Missouri
Unincorporated communities in Missouri